Monarchism is the advocacy of the system of monarchy or monarchical rule. A monarchist is an individual who supports this form of government independently of any specific monarch, whereas one who supports a particular monarch is a royalist. Conversely, the opposition to monarchical rule is referred to as republicanism.

Depending on the country, a royalist may advocate for the rule of the person who sits on the throne, a regent, a pretender, or someone who would otherwise occupy the throne but has been deposed.

History
Monarchical rule is among the oldest political institutions. The similar form of societal hierarchy known as chiefdom or tribal kingship is prehistoric. Chiefdoms provided the concept of state formation, which started with civilizations such as Mesopotamia, Ancient Egypt and the Indus Valley civilization. In some parts of the world, chiefdoms became monarchies.

Monarchs have generally ceded power in the modern era, having substantially diminished since World War I and World War II. This process can be traced back to the 18th century, when Voltaire and others encouraged "enlightened absolutism", which was embraced by the Holy Roman Emperor Joseph II and by Catherine II of Russia. 

In 1685 the Enlightenment began. This would result in new anti-monarchist ideas which resulted in several revolutions such as the 18th century American Revolution and the French Revolution which were both additional steps in the weakening of power of European monarchies. Each in its different way exemplified the concept of popular sovereignty upheld by Jean-Jacques Rousseau. 1848 then ushered in a wave of revolutions against the continental European monarchies. World War I and its aftermath saw the end of three major European monarchies: the Russian Romanov dynasty, the German Hohenzollern dynasty, including all other German monarchies and the Austro-Hungarian Habsburg dynasty.

With the arrival of socialism in Eastern Europe by the end of 1947, the remaining Eastern European monarchies, namely the Kingdom of Romania, the Kingdom of Hungary, the Kingdom of Albania, the Kingdom of Bulgaria and the Kingdom of Yugoslavia, were all abolished and replaced by socialist republics.

Africa

Central Africa
In 1966, the Central African Republic was overthrown at the hands of Jean-Bédel Bokassa during the Saint-Sylvestre coup d'état. He established the Central African Empire in 1976 and ruled as Emperor Bokassa I until 1979, when he was subsequently deposed during Operation Caban and Central Africa returned to republican rule.

Ethiopia
In 1974, one of the world's oldest monarchies was abolished in Ethiopia with the fall of Emperor Haile Selassie.

Asia

China
China possessed a monarchy from prehistoric times up until 1912, when Emperor Puyi was deposed. He was briefly restored to the throne for twelve days during the Manchu Restoration in 1917, but this attempt was quickly undone by republican forces. The end of the Chinese monarchy ushered in the Republic of China.

India
In India, monarchies recorded history of thousands of years before the country was declared a republic country in 1950. King George VI had previously been the last Emperor of India until August 1947, when the British Raj dissolved. Karan Singh served as the last prince regent of Jammu and Kashmir until November 1952.

Iran
Monarchism possessed an important role in the 1979 Iranian Revolution and also played a role in the modern political affairs of Nepal. Nepal was one of the last states to have had an absolute monarch, which continued until King Gyanendra was peacefully deposed in May 2008 and the country became a federal republic.

Japan
The Japanese Emperor is the last remaining head of state with the title of "Emperor". The Imperial House of Japan is the world's oldest, having existed continuously since at least the 6th century. Since the adoption of the 1947 Japanese constitution, the Emperor has been made a ceremonial head of state, without any nominal political powers. Today, Naruhito serves as the Emperor of Japan and enjoys wide support from the Japanese population.

Europe

Albania
The last separate monarchy to take root in Europe, Albania began its recognised modern existence as a principality (1914) and became a kingdom after a republican interlude in 1925–1928. Since 1945 the country has operated as an independent republic. The Albanian Democratic Monarchist Movement Party (founded in 2004) and the Legality Movement Party (founded in 1924) advocate restoration of the House of Zogu as monarchs—the concept has gained little electoral support.

Austria-Hungary
Following the collapse of Austria-Hungary, the Republic of German-Austria was proclaimed. The Constitutional Assembly of German Austria passed the Habsburg Law, which permanently exiled the Habsburg family from Austria. Despite this, significant support for the Habsburg family persisted in Austria. Following the Anschluss of 1938, the Nazi government suppressed monarchist activities. By the time Nazi rule ended in Austria, support for monarchism had largely evaporated.

In Hungary, the rise of the Hungarian Soviet Republic in 1919 provoked an increase in support for monarchism; however, efforts by Hungarian monarchists failed to bring back a royal head of state, and the monarchists settled for a regent, Admiral Miklós Horthy, to represent the monarchy until it could be restored. Horthy ruled as regent from 1920 to 1944. During his regency, attempts were made by Karl von Habsburg to return to the Hungarian throne, which ultimately failed. Following Karl's death in 1922, his claim to the Kingdom of Hungary was inherited by Otto von Habsburg (1912–2011), although no further attempts were made to take the Hungarian throne.

France

During the French Revolution, the French First Republic was proclaimed in 1792 following the overthrow of Louis XVI. The Republic failed, and transitioned into the First French Empire under Napoleon I in 1804. Napoleon's fall in 1814 led to the Bourbon Restoration in France under Louis XVIII. The restored Kingdom of France lasted until 1830, save a brief period during the Hundred Days (1815) when Napoleon attempted to retake control. In 1830, King Charles X was overthrown during the July Revolution and replaced with his cousin, Louis Philippe I, who reigned as "King of the French". Louis Phillipe I ruled for 18 years, until his abdication due to the French Revolution of 1848. After this, the French Second Republic was formed, which lasted for just four years. Its first president, Louis-Napoléon Bonaparte, initiated a coup in 1851 and proclaimed himself Emperor Napoleon III the following year, establishing the Second French Empire. It lasted until 1870, and was succeeded by the French Third Republic. 

Following Napoleon III's fall in 1870, Henri, Count of Chambord was offered the French throne, but he declined due to a disagreement with the French government. Due to his refusal, the French royalists intended to offer the crown to the Orleanist Prince Philippe, Count of Paris upon Henri's death. However, Henri lived longer than expected, and by the time of his death in 1883, support for monarchy had weakened too greatly to offer Phillipe the crown.

Since then, figures and groups such as Charles Maurras (1868–1952) and Action Française (founded in 1899) have advocated for the restoration of the monarchy. During World War II, many French monarchists fought (1940–1944) with the French Resistance. Some, such as Henri d'Astier de la Vigerie pushed for a coup against Vichy France, which would restore Henri, Count of Paris to the throne of France as King. However, this idea was stopped by Dwight D. Eisenhower, among others. After the war, Henri enjoyed wide popularity and maintained a friendship with Charles de Gaulle, whom he tried to convince to support a restoration of the monarchy. While de Gaulle was sympathetic, he ultimately abandoned the idea, and no serious attempt to restore the monarchy ever came to fruition. Today, the majority of French monarchists, a minority in France, are Orléanists and advocate for a restoration of the crown under Jean, Count of Paris, pretender to the throne as Jean IV. A smaller monarchist group, known as Legitimists, instead support Louis Alphonse de Bourbon, styled Louis XX.

Germany
In 1920s Germany a number of monarchists gathered around the German National People's Party (founded in 1918), which demanded the return of the Hohenzollern monarchy and an end to the Weimar Republic; the party retained a large base of support until the rise of Nazism in the 1930s, as Adolf Hitler staunchly opposed monarchism.

Italy
The aftermath of World War II saw the return of monarchist/republican rivalry in Italy, where a referendum was held on whether the state should remain a monarchy or become a republic. The republican side won the vote by a narrow margin, and the modern Republic of Italy was created.

Liechtenstein
There have been 16 monarchs of the Principality of Liechtenstein since 1608. The current Prince of Liechtenstein, Hans-Adam II, has reigned since 1989. In 2003, during a referendum, 64.3% of the population voted to increase the power of the prince.

Norway
The position of King of Norway has existed continuously since the unification of Norway in 872. Following the dissolution of union with Sweden and the abdication of King Oscar II of Sweden as King of Norway, the 1905 Norwegian monarchy referendum saw 78.94% of Norway's voters approving the government's proposition to invite Prince Carl of Denmark to become their new king. Following the vote, the prince then accepted the offer, becoming King Haakon VII. 

In 2022, the Norwegian parliament held a vote on abolishing the monarchy and replacing it with a republic. The proposal failed, with a 134–35 result in favor of retaining the monarchy. The idea was highly controversial in Norway, as the vote was spearheaded by the sitting Minister of Culture and Equality, who had sworn an oath of loyalty to King Harald V of Norway the previous year. Additionally, when polls were conducted, it was found that 84% of the Norwegian public supported the monarchy, with only 16% unsure or against the monarchy.

Russia
Monarchy in the Russian Empire collapsed in March 1917, following the abdication of Tsar Nicholas II. Parts of the White movement, and in particular émigrés and their  (founded in 1921 and now based in Canada) continued to advocate for monarchy as "the sole path to the rebirth of Russia". In the modern era, a minority of Russians, including Vladimir Zhirinovsky (1946–2022), have openly advocated for a restoration of the Russian monarchy. Grand Duchess Maria Vladimirovna is widely considered the valid heir to the throne, in the event that a restoration occurs.  Other pretenders and their supporters dispute her claim.

Spain
In 1868, Queen Isabella II of Spain was deposed during the Spanish Glorious Revolution. The Duke of Aosta , an Italian prince, was invited to rule and replace Isabella. He did so for a three-year period, reigning as Amadeo I before abdicating in 1873, resulting in the establishment of the First Spanish Republic. The republic lasted less than two years, and was overthrown during a coup by General Arsenio Martínez Campos. Campos restored the Bourbon monarchy under Isabella II's more popular son, Alfonso XII.

After the 1931 Spanish local elections, King Alfonso XIII voluntarily left Spain and republicans proclaimed a Second Spanish Republic.
After the assassination of opposition leader José Calvo Sotelo in 1936, right-wing forces banded together to overthrow the Republic. During the Spanish Civil War of 1936 to 1939, General Francisco Franco established the basis for the Spanish State (1939–1975). In 1938, the autocratic government of Franco claimed to have reconstituted the Spanish monarchy in absentia (and in this case ultimately yielded to a restoration, in the person of King Juan Carlos).

In 1975, Juan Carlos I became King of Spain and began the Spanish transition to democracy. He abdicated in 2014, and was succeeded by his son Felipe VI.

United Kingdom

In England, royalty ceded power to other groups in a gradual process. In 1215, a group of nobles forced King John to sign the Magna Carta, which guaranteed the English barons certain liberties and established that the king's powers were not absolute. King Charles I was executed in 1649, and the Commonwealth of England was established as a republic. Highly unpopular, the republic was ended in 1660, and the monarchy was restored under King Charles II. In 1687–88, the Glorious Revolution and the overthrow of King James II established the principles of constitutional monarchy, which would later be worked out by Locke and other thinkers. However, absolute monarchy, justified by Hobbes in Leviathan (1651), remained a prominent principle elsewhere.

Following the Glorious Revolution, William III and Mary II were established as constitutional monarchs, with less power than their predecessor James II. Since then, royal power has become more ceremonial, with powers such as refusal to assent last exercised in 1708 by Queen Anne. Once part of the United Kingdom (1801–1922), southern Ireland rejected monarchy and became the Republic of Ireland in 1949. Support for a ceremonial monarchy remains high in Britain: Queen Elizabeth II, possessed wide support from the U.K.'s population.

Vatican City State
The Vatican City State is considered to be Europe's last absolute monarchy. The micronation is headed by the Pope, who doubles as its monarch according to the Vatican constitution. The nation was formed under Pope Pius XI in 1929, following the signing of the Lateran Treaty. It was the successor state to the Papal States, which collapsed under Pope Pius IX in 1870. Pope Francis (in office from 2013) serves as the nation's absolute monarch.

North America

Canada
Canada possesses one of the world's oldest continuous monarchies, having been established in the 16th century. Queen Elizabeth II had served as its sovereign since her ascension to the throne in 1952 until her death in 2022.

Costa Rica
The struggle between monarchists and republicans led the country to confront each other in the Costa Rican civil war of 1823. Political figures who stand out as Costa Rican monarchists include Joaquín de Oreamuno y Muñoz de la Trinidad, José Santos Lombardo y Alvarado and José Rafael Gallegos Alvarado. among others .Costa Rica stands out for being one of the few countries with a foreign monarchism, that is, where the monarchists did not intend to establish an indigenous monarchy. Costa Rican monarchists were loyal to Emperor Agustín de Iturbide of the First Mexican Empire.

Honduras
After the independence of the general captaincy of Guatemala from the Spanish empire, she joined the First Mexican Empire for a brief period, this unleashed the division of the Honduran elites. These were divided between the annexationists, made up mostly of illustrious spaniskh-descendant families and members of the conservative party who supported the idea of being part of an empire, and the liberals who wanted Central America to be a separate nation under a republican system.

The greatest example of this separation was in the two most important cities of the province, on the one hand Comayagua, which firmly supported the legitimacy of Iturbide I as emperor and remained a pro-monarchist bastion in Honduras, and on the other hand Tegucigalpa who supported the idea of forming a federation of Central American states under a republican system.

Mexico
After obtaining independence from Spain, the First Mexican Empire was established under Emperor Agustín I. His reign lasted less than one year, and he was forcefully deposed. In 1864, the Second Mexican Empire was formed under Emperor Maximilian I. Maximilian's government enjoyed French aid, but opposition from America, and collapsed after three years. Much like Agustín I, Maximilian I was deposed and later executed by his republican enemies. Since 1867, Mexico has not possessed a monarchy. 

Today, some Mexican monarchist organizations advocate for Maximilian von Götzen-Iturbide or Carlos Felipe de Habsburgo to be instated as the Emperor of Mexico.

Nicaragua
The miskito ethnic group inhabits part of the Atlantic coast of Honduras and Nicaragua, by the beginning of the 17th century the said ethnic group was reorganized under a single chief known as Ta Uplika, for the reign of his grandson King Oldman I this group had a very close relationship With the English, they managed to turn the Mosquitia coast into an English protectorate that would decline in the 19th century until it completely disappeared in 1894 with the abdication of Robert II. 

Currently, the Miskitos who are shot between the two countries have denounced the neglect of their communities and abuses committed by the authorities. As a result of this, in Nicaragua several Miskito people began a movement of separatism from present-day Nicaragua and a re-institution of the monarchy.

United States
English settlers first established the colony of Jamestown in 1607, taking its name after King James VI and I. For 169 years, the Thirteen Colonies were ruled by the authority of the British crown. The Thirteen American Colonies possessed a total of 10 monarchs, ending with George III. During the American Revolutionary War, the colonies declared independence from Britain in 1776. Despite erroneous popular belief, the Revolutionary war was in fact fought over independence, not anti-monarchism as is commonly believed. In fact, many American colonists who fought in the war against George III were monarchists themselves, who opposed George, but desired to possess a different king. Additionally, the American colonists received the financial support of Louis XVI and Charles III of Spain during the war.

After the U.S. declared its independence, the form of government by which it would operate still remained unsettled. At least two of America's Founding Fathers, Alexander Hamilton and Nathaniel Gorham, believed that America should be an independent monarchy, . Various proposals to create an American monarchy were considered, including the Prussian scheme which would have made Prince Henry of Prussia king of the United States. Hamilton proposed that the leader of America should be an elected monarch, while Gorham pushed for a hereditary monarchy. U.S. military officer Lewis Nicola also desired for America to be a monarchy, suggesting George Washington accept the crown of America, which he declined. All attempts ultimately failed, and America was founded a Republic.

During the American Civil War, a return to monarchy was considered as a way to solve the crisis, though it never came to fruition. Since then, the idea has possessed low support, but has been advocated by some public figures such as Ralph Adams Cram, Solange Hertz, Leland B. Yeager, Michael Auslin, Charles A. Coulombe, and Curtis Yarvin.

Current monarchies

The majority of current monarchies are constitutional monarchies. In most of these, the monarch wields only symbolic power, although in some, the monarch does play a role in political affairs. In Thailand, for instance, King Bhumibol Adulyadej, who reigned from 1946 to 2016, played a critical role in the nation's political agenda and in various military coups. Similarly, in Morocco, King Mohammed VI wields significant, but not absolute power.

Liechtenstein is a democratic principality whose citizens have voluntarily given more power to their monarch in recent years.

There remain a handful of countries in which the monarch is the true ruler. The majority of these countries are oil-producing Arab Islamic monarchies like Saudi Arabia, Bahrain, Qatar, Oman, and the United Arab Emirates. Other strong monarchies include Brunei and Eswatini.

Political philosophy
Absolute monarchy stands as an opposition to anarchism and, additionally since the Age of Enlightenment; liberalism, communism and socialism.

Otto von Habsburg advocated a form of constitutional monarchy based on the primacy of the supreme judicial function, with hereditary succession, mediation by a tribunal is warranted if suitability is problematic.

Non-partisanship 
British political scientist Vernon Bogdanor justifies monarchy on the grounds that it provides for a nonpartisan head of state, separate from the head of government, and thus ensures that the highest representative of the country, at home and internationally, does not represent a particular political party, but all people. Bogdanor also notes that monarchies can play a helpful unifying role in a multinational state, noting that "In Belgium, it is sometimes said that the king is the only Belgian, everyone else being either Fleming or Walloon" and that the British sovereign can belong to all of the United Kingdom's constituent countries (England, Scotland, Wales, and Northern Ireland), without belonging to any particular one of them.

Private interest 
Thomas Hobbes wrote that the private interest of the monarchy is the same with the public. The riches, power, and humour of a monarch arise only from the riches, strength, and reputation of his subjects. An elected Head of State is incentivised to increase his own wealth for leaving office after a few years whereas a monarch has no reason to corrupt because he would be cheating himself.

Wise counsel 
Thomas Hobbes wrote that a monarch can receive wise counsel with secrecy while an assembly cannot. Advisors to the assembly tend to be well-versed more in the acquisition of their own wealth than of knowledge; are likely to give their advices in long discourses which often excite men into action but do not govern them in it, moved by the flame of passion instead of enlightenment. Their multitude is a weakness.

Long termism 
Thomas Hobbes wrote that the resolutions of a monarch are subject to no inconsistency save for human nature; in assemblies, inconsistencies arise from the number. For in an assembly, as little as the absence of a few or the diligent appearance of a few of the contrary opinion, "undoes today all that was done yesterday".

Civil war reduction 
Thomas Hobbes wrote that a monarch cannot disagree with himself, out of envy or interest, but an assembly may and to such a height that may produce a civil war.

Liberty 
The International Monarchist League, founded in 1943, has always sought to promote monarchy on the grounds that it strengthens popular liberty, both in a democracy and in a dictatorship, because by definition the monarch is not beholden to politicians.

British-American libertarian writer Matthew Feeney argues that European constitutional monarchies "have managed for the most part to avoid extreme politics"—specifically fascism, communism, and military dictatorship—"in part because monarchies provide a check on the wills of populist politicians" by representing entrenched customs and traditions. Feeny notes that European monarchies—such as the Danish, Belgian, Swedish, Dutch, Norwegian, and British—have ruled over countries that are among the most stable, prosperous, and free in the world.

Socialist writer George Orwell argued a similar point, that constitutional monarchy is effective at preventing the development of Fascism.

"The function of the King in promoting stability and acting as a sort of keystone in a non-democratic society is, of course, obvious. But he also has, or can have, the function of acting as an escape-valve for dangerous emotions. A French journalist said to me once that the monarchy was one of the things that have saved Britain from Fascism...It is at any rate possible that while this division of function exists a Hitler or a Stalin cannot come to power. On the whole the European countries which have most successfully avoided Fascism have been constitutional monarchies... I have often advocated that a Labour government, i.e. one that meant business, would abolish titles while retaining the Royal Family.’

Erik von Kuehnelt-Leddihn took a different approach, arguing that liberty and equality are contradictions. As such, he argued that attempts to establish greater social equality through the abolishment of monarchy, ultimately results in a greater loss of liberty for citizens. He believed that equality can only be accomplished through the suppression of liberty, as humans are naturally unequal and hierarchical. Kuehnelt-Leddihn also believed that people are on average freer under monarchies than they are under democratic republics, as the latter tends to more easily become tyrannical through ochlocracy. In Liberty or Equality, he writes:

There is little doubt that the American Congress or the French Chambers have a power over their nations which would rouse the envy of a Louis XIV or a George III, were they alive today. Not only prohibition, but also the income tax declaration, selective service, obligatory schooling, the fingerprinting of blameless citizens, premarital blood tests—none of these totalitarian measures would even the royal absolutism of the seventeenth century have dared to introduce.

Hans-Hermann Hoppe also argues that monarchy helps to preserve individual liberty more effectively than democracy.

Natural desire for hierarchy 
In a 1943 essay in The Spectator, "Equality", British author C.S. Lewis criticized egalitarianism, and its corresponding call for the abolition of monarchy, as contrary to human nature, writing, A man's reaction to Monarchy is a kind of test. Monarchy can easily be 'debunked'; but watch the faces, mark well the accents, of the debunkers. These are the men whose tap-root in Eden has been cut: whom no rumour of the polyphony, the dance, can reach—men to whom pebbles laid in a row are more beautiful than an arch...Where men are forbidden to honour a king they honour millionaires, athletes, or film-stars instead: even famous prostitutes or gangsters. For spiritual nature, like bodily nature, will be served; deny it food and it will gobble poison.

Political accountability 
Oxford political scientists Petra Schleiter and Edward Morgan-Jones wrote that in monarchies, it is more common to hold elections than non-electoral replacements.

Notable works
Notable works arguing in favor of monarchy include

 Abbott, Tony (1995). The Minimal Monarchy: And Why It Still Makes Sense For Australia
 Alighieri, Dante (c. 1312). De Monarchia
 Aquinas, Thomas (1267). De Regno, to the King of Cyprus
 Auslin, Michael (2014). America Needs a King
 Balmes, Jaime (1850). European Civilization: Protestantism and Catholicity Compared in their Effects on the Civilization of Europe 
 Bellarmine, Robert (1588). De Romano Pontifice, On the Roman Pontiff
 Bodin, Jean (1576). The Six Books of the Republic 
 Bogdanor, Vernon (1997). The Monarchy and the Constitution
 Bossuet, Jacques-Bénigne (1709). Politics Drawn from the Very Words of Holy Scripture
 Charles I of England (1649). Eikon Basilike 
 Coulombe, Charles A. (2016). Star-Spangled Crown: A Simple Guide to the American Monarchy
 Chateaubriand, François-René de (1814). Of Buonaparte, and the Bourbons, and of the Necessity of Rallying Round Our Legitimate Princes
 Cram, Ralph Adams (1936). Invitation to Monarchy

 Filmer, Robert (1680). Patriarcha 
 Hobbes, Thomas (1651). Leviathan
 Hermann-Hoppe, Hans (2001). Democracy: The God That Failed
 — (2014). From Aristocracy to Monarchy to Democracy: A Tale of Moral and Economic Folly and Decay
 James VI and I (1598). The True Law of Free Monarchies
 — (1599). Basilikon Doron
 Jean, Count of Paris (2009). Un Prince Français 
 Kuehnelt-Leddihn, Erik von (1952). Liberty or Equality: The Challenge of Our Times 
 — (2000). Monarchy and War
 Maistre, Joseph de (1797). Considerations on France
 Pius VI (1793). Pourquoi Notre Voix
 Scruton, Roger (1991). A Focus of Loyalty Higher Than the State
  Ségur, Louis Gaston Adrien de (1871). Vive le Roi!
 Whittle, Peter (2011). Monarchy Matters

Support for monarchy

Current monarchies

Former monarchies

The following is a list of former monarchies and their percentage of public support for monarchism.

Notable monarchists

Several notable public figures who advocated for monarchy or are monarchists include:

Arts and entertainment

 Honoré de Balzac, French novelist & playwright
 Fyodor Dostoevsky, Russian novelist & essayist
 Pedro Muñoz Seca, Spanish playwright
 T.S. Eliot, American-British poet & writer
 Salvador Dalí, Spanish artist
 Hergé, Belgian cartoonist
 Yukio Mishima, Japanese author
 Joan Collins, English actress & author
 Stephen Fry, English actor & author

Clergy

 Thomas Aquinas, Italian Catholic priest & theologian
 Robert Bellarmine, Italian Cardinal & theologian
 Jacques-Bénigne Bossuet, French Bishop & theologian
 Jules Mazarin, Italian Cardinal & minister
 André-Hercule de Fleury, French Cardinal & minister
 Pius VI, Italian Pope & ruler of the Papal States
 Fabrizio Ruffo, Italian Cardinal & treasurer
 Ercole Consalvi, Italian Cardinal Secretary of State
 Pelagio Antonio de Labastida y Dávalos, Mexican Archbishop & Regent of the Second Mexican Empire 
 Louis Gaston Adrien de Ségur, French Bishop & writer
 Louis Billot, French priest & theologian
 Pius XII, Italian Pope & sovereign of Vatican City
 József Mindszenty, Hungarian Cardinal & Prince-primate

Philosophy

 Dante Alighieri, Italian poet & philosopher
 Jean Bodin, French political philosopher
 Robert Filmer, English political theorist
 Thomas Hobbes, English philosopher
 Joseph de Maistre, Savoyard philosopher & writer
 Juan Donoso Cortés, Spanish politician & political theologian
 Søren Kierkegaard, Danish philosopher & theologian
 Charles Maurras, French author & philosopher
 Kang Youwei, Chinese political thinker & reformer
 Ralph Adams Cram, American architect & writer
 Erik von Kuehnelt-Leddihn, Austrian political scientist & philosopher
 Vernon Bogdanor, British political scientist & historian
 Roger Scruton, English philosopher & writer
 Hans Hermann-Hoppe, German-American political theorist
 Charles A. Coulombe, American historian & author

Politics

 François-René de Chateaubriand, French historian & Ambassador
 Manuel Belgrano, Argentinian politician
 Klemens von Metternich, Austrian Chancellor
 Miguel Miramón, Mexican President & military general
 Otto von Bismarck, German Chancellor
 Juan Vázquez de Mella, Spanish politician & political theorist
 Panagis Tsaldaris, Greek Prime Minister
 Winston Churchill, British Prime Minister of the U.K.
 Călin Popescu-Tăriceanu, Romanian Prime Minister
 Salome Zourabichvili, Georgian President
 Tony Abbott, Australian Prime Minister
 Carla Zambelli, Brazilian politician

Monarchist movements and parties

 Action Française
 Alfonsism
 Alliance Royale
 Australian Monarchist League
 Australians for Constitutional Monarchy
 Bonapartism
 Black-Yellow Alliance
 Carlism
 Cavalier
 Chouannerie
 Conservative-Monarchist Club
 Constantian Society
 Constitutionalist Party of Iran
 Hawaiian sovereignty movement
 Hovpartiet
 International Monarchist League
 Jacobitism
 Koruna Česká (party)
 Legality Movement
 Legitimism
 Liberal Democratic Party of Russia
 Loyalism
 Loyalist (American Revolution)
 Miguelist
 Monarchist League of Canada
 Monarchist Party of Russia
 Monarchy New Zealand
 Nouvelle Action Royaliste
 Orléanism
 Rastriya Prajatantra Party
 Royal Stuart Society
 Royalist Party
 Sanfedismo
 Sonnō jōi
 Tradition und Leben
 Traditionalist Communion
 Ultra-royalist

Antimonarchism

Criticism of monarchy can be targeted against the general form of government—monarchy—or more specifically, to particular monarchical governments as controlled by hereditary royal families. In some cases, this criticism can be curtailed by legal restrictions and be considered criminal speech, as in lèse-majesté. Monarchies in Europe and their underlying concepts, such as the Divine Right of Kings, were often criticized during the Age of Enlightenment, which notably paved the way to the French Revolution and the proclamation of the abolition of the monarchy in France. Earlier, the American Revolution had seen the Patriots suppress the Loyalists and expel all royal officials. In this century, monarchies are present in the world in many forms with different degrees of royal power and involvement in civil affairs:

 Absolute monarchies in Brunei, Eswatini, Oman, Qatar, Saudi Arabia, the United Arab Emirates, and the Vatican City;
 Constitutional monarchies in the United Kingdom and its sovereign's Commonwealth Realms, and in Belgium, Denmark, Japan, Liechtenstein, Luxembourg, Malaysia, Monaco, The Netherlands, Norway, Spain, Sweden, Thailand, and others.

The twentieth century, beginning with the 1917 February Revolution in Russia and accelerated by two world wars, saw many European countries replace their monarchies with republics, while others replaced their absolute monarchies with constitutional monarchies. Reverse movements have also occurred, with brief returns of the monarchy in France under the Bourbon Restoration, the July Monarchy, and the Second French Empire, the Stuarts after the English Civil War and the Bourbons in Spain after the Franco dictatorship.

See also
 Abolition of monarchy
 Criticism of monarchy
 Dark Enlightenment
 Legitimists
 List of dynasties
 Reactionary modernism
 Republicanism
 Royalist

Notes

References

External links
 The Monarchist League
 IMC, official site of the International Monarchist Conference.
 SYLM, Support Your Local Monarch, the independent monarchist community.

 

ja:君主主義